Karanjin is a furanoflavonol, a type of flavonoid. It is obtained from the seeds of the karanja tree (Millettia pinnata or Pongamia glabra Vent.), a tree growing wild in south India. Karanjin is an acaricide and insecticide.  Karanjin is reported to have nitrification inhibitory properties.

References

Flavonols
Furans
Phenol ethers